The 1964 Southern Illinois Salukis football team was an American football team that represented Southern Illinois University (now known as Southern Illinois University Carbondale) as an independent during the 1964 NCAA College Division football season.  Under first-year head coach Don Shroyer, the team compiled a 2–8 record. The team played its home games at McAndrew Stadium in Carbondale, Illinois.

Schedule

References

Southern Illinois
Southern Illinois Salukis football seasons
Southern Illinois Salukis football